Acrocercops bifasciata is a moth of the family Gracillariidae. It is known from Cameroon, the Democratic Republic of Congo, Malawi, Nigeria, Somalia, Sudan, Tanzania, Gambia, Uganda and India.

The larvae feed on Abelmoschus esculentus, Abutilon species, Gossypium species (including Gossypium barbadense), Malva species and Urena lobata. They probably mine the leaves of their host plant.

References

bifasciata
Moths described in 1891
Moths of Africa